Leola is a feminine name and may refer to:

Places
 Leola, Arkansas
 Leola, Pennsylvania
 Leola, South Dakota
 Leola, Wisconsin

People (given name)
 Leola Brody (1922–1997), American baseball player
 Leola Hall (1881–1930), American architect
 Leola Neal (1911–1995), Canadian psychologist 
 Leola C. Robinson-Simpson (born 1944), American politician

Fictional characters (given name)
 Leola Staunton, a character in Robertson Davies' novel Fifth Business

See also
Korp! Leola, Estonian student fraternity